Lycastris griseipennis is a species of syrphid fly in the family Syrphidae.

Distribution
India.

References

Eristalinae
Insects described in 1964
Diptera of Asia